The Seattle Film Critics Society (SFCS), founded by Michael Ward, is represented by 40 members in print, radio, television and online mediums who live and work in the greater Seattle area. Established in 2016, the society is dedicated to supporting local productions and festivals, enhancing public education, awareness, and appreciation of cinema, and strengthening the bonds of critical dialogue as it pertains to the cinematic arts. They seek to highlight the best films produced each year–both by the major studios and independent filmmakers–and share their love of cinema with Seattle-area residents. The SFCS formalizes an already robust network of film critics and reviewers in Seattle and surrounding areas of Washington state. The society also presents an annual awards announcement, honoring the best achievements in film, nominated and selected by all active members of the society.

In 2023, the category "Achievement in Pacific Northwest Filmmaking" was introduced to specifically honor Pacific Northwest filmmaking. This award is meant to celebrate the many talented filmmakers who call the region home and who produce work there. A nominating committee carefully considered a wide variety of feature films released during 2022 with strong connections to the region and selected five finalists. The winner was determined by a vote of the full membership and announced alongside the SFCS's other awards on January 17, 2023.

Members
Board of Directors

 President – Matt Oakes
 Vice President – (Vacant)
 Treasurer – Steve Reeder
 Secretary – Sara Michelle Fetters
 Awards Coordinator – Josh Bis
 Membership Coordinator – Mike Ward
 Communications Director – Marc Morin
 Trustees – Kathy Fennessy

Our Members

 Aaron White
 Adam Gehrke
 Allen Almachar
 Brent McKnight
 Brian Taibl ("Brian the Movie Guy")
 Calvin Kemph
 Candice McMillan
 Chase Hutchinson
 Collier Jennings
 David Chen
 Erik Samdahl
 Jas Keimig
 Joe Hammerschmidt
 That Guy Named John
 Josh Bis
 Justin Moore
 Kathy Fennessy
 Linda Gwilym
 Marc Morin
 Matt Lynch
 Matt Oakes
 Michael Clawson
 Michael Medved
 Mike Ward
 Morgen Schuler
 Paul Carlson
 Rene Sanchez
 Ryan Bordow
 Ryan Oliver
 Sara Michelle Fetters
 Sean Gilman
 Silas Lindenstein
 Steve Reeder
 Taylor Baker
 Thomas Stoneham-Judge
 Tim Hall
 Vaughn Swearingen
 Warren Cantrell

Emeritus Members

 Moira Macdonald
 Tom Tangney

Categories

 Best Picture of the Year
 Best Director
 Best Actor in a Leading Role
 Best Actress in a Leading Role
 Best Actor in a Supporting Role
 Best Actress in a Supporting Role
 Best Ensemble Cast
 Best Action Choreography
 Best Screenplay
 Best Animated Feature
 Best Documentary Feature
 Best Film Not in the English Language
 Best Cinematography
 Best Costume Design
 Best Film Editing
 Best Original Score
 Best Production Design
 Best Visual Effects
 Best Youth Performance
 Villain of the Year
 Achievement in Pacific Northwest Filmmaking

Ceremony information

2016 Seattle Film Critics Society Awards

2017 Seattle Film Critics Society Awards

2018 Seattle Film Critics Society Awards

2019 Seattle Film Critics Society Awards

2020 Seattle Film Critics Society Awards

2021 Seattle Film Critics Society Awards

2022 Seattle Film Critics Society Awards

Seattle Film Critics Society Award for Best Picture of the Year

Seattle Film Critics Society Award for Best Director

Seattle Film Critics Society Award for Best Actor in a Leading Role

Seattle Film Critics Society Award for Best Actress in a Leading Role

Seattle Film Critics Society Award for Best Actor in a Supporting Role

Seattle Film Critics Society Award for Best Actress in a Supporting Role

Seattle Film Critics Society Award for Best Ensemble Cast

Seattle Film Critics Society Award for Best Action Choreography

Seattle Film Critics Society Award for Best Screenplay

Seattle Film Critics Society Award for Best Animated Feature

Seattle Film Critics Society Award for Best Documentary Feature

Seattle Film Critics Society Award for Best Foreign Language Film/Film Not in the English Language/International Film

Seattle Film Critics Society Award for Best Cinematography

Seattle Film Critics Society Award for Best Costume Design

Seattle Film Critics Society Award for Best Film Editing

Seattle Film Critics Society Award for Best Original Score

Seattle Film Critics Society Award for Best Production Design

Seattle Film Critics Society Award for Best Visual Effects

Seattle Film Critics Society Award for Best Youth Performance

Seattle Film Critics Society Award for Villain of the Year

Achievement in Pacific Northwest Filmmaking

References

External links
 

2016 film awards
Awards established in 2016
Organizations established in 2016
American film critics associations
Seattle Film Critics Society Awards
Film organizations in the United States